The 2013 Grand Prix de Dottignies was the 12th edition of a one-day women's cycle race held in Dottignies, Belgium on April 1 2013. The tour has an UCI rating of 1.2. The race was won by Vera Koedooder of Sengers Ladies Cycling Team, fending off the  duo of Iris Slappendel and Sanne van Paassen

References

2013 in Belgian sport
2013 in women's road cycling
Grand Prix de Dottignies